Yuncheng (571) is a Type 054A frigate of the People's Liberation Army Navy. She was commissioned in December 2009.

Development and design 

The Type 054A carries HQ-16 medium-range air defence missiles and anti-submarine missiles in a vertical launching system (VLS) system. The HQ-16 has a range of up to 50 km, with superior range and engagement angles to the Type 054's HQ-7. The Type 054A's VLS uses a hot launch method; a shared common exhaust system is sited between the two rows of rectangular launching tubes.

The four AK-630 close-in weapon systems (CIWS) of the Type 054 were replaced with two Type 730 CIWS on the Type 054A. The autonomous Type 730 provides improved reaction time against close-in threats.

Construction and career 
Yuncheng was launched on 8 February 2009 at the Huangpu Shipyard in Shanghai. Commissioned in December 2009.

On November 2, 2011, Yuncheng and Haikou formed the tenth navy escort fleet from Zhanjiang City, Guangdong Province to perform escort missions in the Gulf of Aden and the waters of Somalia. The escort lasted 186 days, with a total voyage of 98,180 nautical miles, and completed 40 batches of 240 Chinese and foreign ships. On June 7, 2012, Yuncheng returned to Zhanjiang Military Port.

On October 22, 2012, Yuncheng, Haikou and Guangzhou crossed the waters south of Okinawa and went to the western Pacific waters for routine training.

On 19 December 2013, the South Sea Fleet consisting of Huangshan, Yuncheng, and Weishanhu set sail from Zhanjiang City and proceeded to the Western Pacific and other waters. Exercises in subjects such as continuous maritime alert, counter-terrorism and counter-piracy, and joint search and rescue.

In May 2014, the China National Offshore Oil Corporation's drilling platform Offshore Oil 981 conducted drilling operations in the Xisha waters. On May 13, Yuncheng arrived in the sea area where the drilling platform was located, driving away the Vietnamese coast guard ship that was interfering with the operation. On August 1, Yuncheng, Changbai Shan and Chaohu formed the eighteenth navy escort formation from a military port in Zhanjiang, and then went to the Gulf of Aden and Somalia.

Chaohu alongside Yuncheng and Changbai Shan made a goodwill visit to Rotterdam on 30 January 2015.

Gallery

References 

2009 ships
Ships built in China
Type 054 frigates